Maryland's Legislative District 2 is one of 47 districts in the state for the Maryland General Assembly. It covers part of Washington County. The district is divided into two sub-districts for the Maryland House of Delegates: District 2A and District 2B.

Demographic characteristics
As of the 2020 United States census, the district had a population of 136,004, of whom 106,380 (78.2%) were of voting age. The racial makeup of the district was 100,530 (73.9%) White, 17,277 (12.7%) African American, 421 (0.3%) Native American, 2,895 (2.1%) Asian, 42 (0.0%) Pacific Islander, 4,392 (3.2%) from some other race, and 10,410 (7.7%) from two or more races. Hispanic or Latino of any race were 9,785 (7.2%) of the population.

The district had 86,264 registered voters as of October 17, 2020, of whom 18,172 (21.1%) were registered as unaffiliated, 36,768 (42.6%) were registered as Republicans, 29,915 (34.7%) were registered as Democrats, and 787 (0.9%) were registered to other parties.

Political representation
The district is represented for the 2023–2027 legislative term in the State Senate by Paul D. Corderman (R) and in the House of Delegates by William Valentine (R, District 2A), William J. Wivell (R, District 2A) and Brooke Grossman (D, District 2B).

References

Washington County, Maryland
02